The Royal Barcelona Trading Company to the Indies  also known as the Barcelona Company was a trading company in the 18th century chartered by the Spanish crown, operating from 1755 to 1785, and which had a monopoly on trade to the Caribbean islands of Puerto Rico, Santo Domingo and Margarita. The company provided a legal framework and a focus for capital which enabled Catalan merchants to break free from the restrictions of the Cadiz monopoly on trade with the Indies, provided skills and contacts that enabled the development of free trade between Catalonia and the Americas to flourish after the company's demise, and contributed to the development of the textile industry which later became the basis of industrialisation in Catalonia.

Historical context 
Since 1503, under the Habsburg kings, all trade with America had been conducted through the port of Seville (and after 1717, Cádiz) under a monopoly that prevented other cities, including Barcelona, from trade with the Americas, or the Indies as they were known.

Tentatively by the late 17th century Catalan goods had reached the Indies via the Spanish coastal trade to Cádiz and this grew slowly until by the mid 1740s entire ships were beginning to be fitted out in Barcelona for transatlantic commerce.

The Barcelona Company was one of a number of chartered companies established by the Bourbon crown in the 18th century, part of the larger Bourbon Reforms, with the intention to reform Spanish commerce with the Americas, to  integrate the economies at the peripheries of the American Empire and to reduce English and French piracy and contraband in the Eastern Caribbean.

These new companies enjoyed commercial privileges (so sometimes called 'Privileged Companies' in Spanish) and included the Caracas Company, the Honduras Company, the Seville Company and the Havana Company. They strongly resembled the English, Dutch and French trading companies of the 17th century.

Activity 
The Barcelona Trading Company was granted a monopoly on trade to the Caribbean islands of Puerto Rico, Santo Domingo and Margarita
as well as being allowed ten annual visits to Guatemala and Honduras, trade with Cumaná (north eastern Venezuela) and some limited trading with Havana.

The company exported principally wine and brandy and increasingly chintz (or printed calico ) as this industry grew in Barcelona. Imported products included  raw cotton, indigo, brazilwood, cocoa, tobacco, sugar amongst others.

The raw cotton and dyes assisted in the production of chintz (or printed calico ) that was then reexported to the Americas as well as the domestic (Spanish peninsula) market. As Ringrose says,

Dissolution 
In 1778, King Charles III signed the 'Decree of Free Trade' between Spain and the Americas effectively removing the company's monopoly. The company was further weakened by losing half its ships through the Spanish involvement in the American Revolutionary War. The company was dissolved between 1784 and 1785 and merged with the Caracas Company to form the Royal Philippine Company.

Legacy 
The company provided a legal framework and a vehicle for the concentration of capital necessary to break free of the Cadiz monopoly (which had proven difficult to surmount through the action of individual merchants) and created the conditions that would later allow free trade with the colonies to flourish.,

These conditions included the focus of a large part of the economic activity of the principality of Catalonia upon trade with the Americas, the integration of the economy with that of the colonies and the building a base of knowledge, skill and commercial contacts amongst merchants who came to consider an Atlantic voyage as an everyday occurrence.

The textile industry became the basis of industrialisation in Catalonia in the 19th century, although to what extent colonial trade contributed to the industry's growth, there is some debate.

In contrast to the greater part of the American empire which achieved independence from Spain in the first decades of the 19th century, Cuba, Santo Domingo and Puerto Rico were amongst those few possessions that remained within the empire. Consequently, the trading relationships with Catalonia continued to build upon those established by the Barcelona Company (Antilles trade with all Spanish ports rising 300% between 1850 and 1890 ) until these territories were finally lost in the Spanish–American War of 1898.

References

External links
Map of the Islands of Hispaniola and Puerto Rico from 1639
Casa de Contratación

Companies established in 1755
Spanish colonization of the Americas
Trading companies established in the 18th century
1755 establishments in Spain
Trade monopolies
Chartered companies
Trading companies of Spain